The 2020–21 season was Coventry City's 137th season in their history and the first season back in the EFL Championship for 8 years and the club's second and final season at St Andrew's. Alongside the Championship, the club participated in the FA Cup and EFL Cup.

The season covers the period from 1 July 2020 to 30 June 2021.

Pre-season
On 10 July, Coventry City announced they would travel to Scotland to face Scottish Premiership side Rangers in a behind closed doors friendly on July 25. The Sky Blues added a second pre-season friendly against Swindon Town which would also be played behind closed doors on August 15, and a third against Peterborough United on August 29. Two more were later added to the schedule against Wolverhampton Wanderers U23 and Milton Keynes Dons. A further friendly against Burton Albion on 25 August was also confirmed. A final pre-season match against Solihull Moors was also added to the schedule.

Competitions

EFL Championship

League table

Results summary

Results by matchday

Matches

The 2020–21 season fixtures were released on 21 August.

FA Cup

The third round draw was made on 30 November, with Premier League and EFL Championship clubs all entering the competition.

EFL Cup

The first round draw was made on 18 August. 
The second round draw was made on 6 September.

Squad information

Squad details

* Player age and appearances/goals for the club as of beginning of 2020–21 season.
† Deal includes option to buy after loan period.

Appearances
Correct as of match played on 8 May 2021

Goalscorers
Correct as of match played on 8 May 2021

Assists
Correct as of match played on 8 May 2021

Yellow cards
Correct as of match played on 8 May 2021

Red cards
Correct as of match played on 8 May 2021

Captains
Correct as of match played on 8 May 2021

Penalties awarded

Suspensions served

International appearances

Monthly & weekly awards

End-of-season awards

Transfers

Transfers in

Loans in

Loans out

Transfers out

References

Coventry City
Coventry City F.C. seasons